The North Dakota Fighting Hawks (formerly known as the Flickertails and the Fighting Sioux) are the athletic teams that represent the University of North Dakota (UND), located in the city of Grand Forks, North Dakota.

Originally in the Division II North Central Conference, UND began transitioning to NCAA's Division I in 2008 with the football program participating in the Division I Football Championship Subdivision (FCS). North Dakota is a member of the Summit League for most sports, the Missouri Valley Football Conference in football, and the National Collegiate Hockey Conference for men's hockey. The Fighting Hawks competed in the Western Athletic Conference in baseball, plus men's and women's swimming & diving, before dropping all three sports. Baseball was dropped after the 2016 season, and the swimming & diving teams were dropped after the 2016–17 season. Women's ice hockey competed in the Western Collegiate Hockey Association before also being dropped after the 2016–17 season.

On January 24, 2017, reports stated that North Dakota would leave the Big Sky Conference to join the Summit League in all sports but football beginning in 2019. The school would join the Missouri Valley Football Conference for football in 2020. The rumored changes became official on January 26, when UND, the Summit League, and the MVFC announced the Fighting Hawks' move to the Summit in 2018 (instead of 2019) and the MVFC at the reported 2020 date. During UND's transition to the MVFC, it will continue to play a full Big Sky football schedule due to contractual commitments; while the Fighting Hawks will not be eligible for the Big Sky title, games against them will count in the Big Sky football standings.

Sports sponsored

Ice hockey (men's) 

Having won eight national championships, the men's hockey team is easily the most recognized of UND teams. A charter member of the National Collegiate Hockey Conference, the Fighting Hawks play in the $100+ million Ralph Engelstad Arena.

Football 

The men's football home games are held in the Alerus Center.

Volleyball

Men's basketball

Former sports
The baseball program dating to 1889 was cancelled at the conclusion of the 2016 season.  The women's hockey program was cancelled at the conclusion of the 2016–17 season.

Athletics hall of fame

The Letterwinners Hall of Fame recognizes the efforts and achievements of former UND student-athletes, coaches, and other supporters of UND athletics. Inductees are selected by the UND Letterwinners Association and representatives of the UND athletic department. The Hall of Fame induction ceremony, sponsored by the UND Letterwinners Association, is held each fall in conjunction with a football game. The Hall of Fame is located on the upper concourse at the south end of the Ralph Engelstad Arena.

Nickname 
UND's nickname was originally The Flickertails, but was unofficially changed to "The Sioux" in 1930. UND's former athletic logo, revealed in 1999, a Native American figure, was designed by Bennett Brien, a local artist and UND graduate of Ojibwa ethnicity. After more than a decade of controversy, the name and logo were retired in 2012. On November 18, 2015, it was revealed at a press conference held by President Robert Kelley that Fighting Hawks, with 57.24% of the vote, would become the new University nickname.

See also
University of North Dakota Sports Network
North Dakota Fighting Hawks baseball

References

External links